Gump's is a luxury American home furnishings and home décor retailer, founded in 1861 in San Francisco, California. The company was acquired by the Chachas family in June 2019 and announced that it would be opening a San Francisco location for the holiday season as well as an e-commerce business.

History
S & G Gump was founded in 1861 as a mirror and frame shop by Solomon Gump and his brother, Gustav. It later sold moldings, gilded cornices, and European artwork to those recently made wealthy from the California Gold Rush.

The business flourished; the store sold products ranging from jewelry made from jade, precious gemstones, and cultured freshwater pearls to products from luxury designers such as Hermès and Buccellati. Customers included Franklin D. Roosevelt, who bought model ships and smoking jackets there, and Sarah Bernhardt, who bought a 17th-century bronze Chinese snake in preparation for playing Cleopatra. It was eventually passed on to Solomon's son Alfred Livingston Gump. The fire following the 1906 earthquake destroyed the store and all of the merchandise, but thanks to Dodie Valencia, A.L. received $17,000 for one of his paintings, which allowed funding for the rebuilding and restocking of the store. A.L. was fueled by his passion for Oriental art and began selling his exotic collectibles from the Far East. He sent his buyers to Japan and China, bringing back exotic rugs, porcelains, silks, bronzes and jades to California's new millionaires.

Richard Gump, one of A.L.’s three children, eventually became president of Gump's after his father's death in 1947.  He continued the family legacy, running the company's overall operations until his retirement in 1975. Gump's was sold to publisher Crowell Collier, which after further mergers became Macmillan Publishers. By June 1989, Gump's had again been sold, this time to an investment group including Japan's Tobu Department Store and the Charterhouse Group. 

In 1993 Gump's was in financial trouble when the catalog company later known as Hanover Direct bought it. They reduced the product lines, holding a liquidation sale on May 24, 1993, and revived the business, then in 2005 sold it to an investment group for $8.5 million.

Gump's filed for Chapter 11 bankruptcy on August 3, 2018. On August 10, final liquidation sales began on the retailer's official website and at its remaining storefront in San Francisco; the store closed on December 23, 2018. In 2019 the newest Gumps owner the Chachas family reopened Gumps in its former long time location 250 Post Street Union Square. However the Chachas closed Gumps for an indeterminate period in 2020 due to the City of San Francisco's regulations on Covid.
Gump's is now open Monday thru Saturday in 2022.

Buddha statue
A statue of Buddha was displayed inside the San Francisco store. The original statue was bronze, acquired in 1928; in 1949 Gump's donated it to the San Francisco Parks Department in memory of Alfred Livingston Gump, and it is in the Japanese Tea Garden in Golden Gate Park. It was replaced at some point by an unusually large Qing Dynasty gilded wood Buddha. This was carved in the Chengde Mountain Resort, the summer capital of the Qing Emperors in the early 19th century, and was the largest of its kind outside a museum. It was bought by one of the 2005 purchasers, New York investment banker John Chachas, who loaned it to the store until the liquidation.

Notes

References

External links

1861 establishments in California
Buildings and structures destroyed in the 1906 San Francisco earthquake
Companies based in San Francisco
Furniture retailers of the United States
Retail companies based in California
Union Square, San Francisco
Companies that filed for Chapter 11 bankruptcy in 2018